Apibacter is a genus of bacteria from the family of Weeksellaceae.

References

Further reading 
 

Flavobacteria
Bacteria genera
Taxa described in 2016